Burnham Park may refer to:

Burnham Park (Chicago)
Burnham Park (Baguio)
The E-ACT Burnham Park Academy, an academy school in Burnham, Buckinghamshire, England